"Callaíta" (English: "Silent/Quiet") is a song by Puerto Rican rapper Bad Bunny and producer Tainy with samples from Zion's song "Alócate". The song was released through Rimas Entertainment on May 31, 2019 as the first single from Bunny's fourth studio album, Un Verano Sin Ti (2022), appearing as the last song from the album acting as a bonus track.

Music video 
The video was released on May 31, 2019, and it was directed by Kacho López Mari and produced by Puerto Rican production company, Filmes Zapatero. In it, Bunny talks about a girl who, despite seemingly meek and quiet, lives a life free of inhibitions and hesitations, both in terms of herself and of people who criticize her.

Charts

Weekly charts

Year-end charts

Certifications

See also 
 List of Billboard Argentina Hot 100 top-ten singles in 2019
 [[List of Billboard Hot Latin Songs and Latin Airplay number ones of 2019|List of Billboard Hot Latin Songs and Latin Airplay number ones of 2019]

References 

2019 singles
2019 songs
Bad Bunny songs
Number-one singles in Spain
Song recordings produced by Tainy
Songs written by Bad Bunny
Spanish-language songs
Tainy songs